The 2015 Atlantic Coast Conference baseball tournament was held from May 19 through 24 at Durham Bulls Athletic Park in Durham, North Carolina.  The annual tournament determines the conference champion of the Division I Atlantic Coast Conference for college baseball.  Florida State won their sixth tournament championship and received the league's automatic bid to the 2015 NCAA Division I baseball tournament.  This was the last of 19 athletic championship events held by the conference in the 2014–15 academic year.

The tournament has been held every year but one since 1973, with Clemson and Georgia Tech each winning nine championships, the most all-time.  Charter league member Duke, along with recent entrants Virginia Tech, Boston College, Pittsburgh and Notre Dame have never won the event.  In Louisville's first season in the ACC in 2015, Louisville had the best regular season record and secured the #1 seed in the conference tournament.

Format and seeding
The winner of each seven team division and the top eight other teams based on conference winning percentage, regardless of division, from the conference's regular season were seeded one through ten.  Seeds one and two were awarded to the two division winners.  The bottom four seeds played an opening round, with the winners advancing to pool play.  The winner of each pool played a single championship game.

Schedule and Results

Play-In Round

Pool Play

Results

Championship

References

Tournament
Atlantic Coast Conference baseball tournament
Atlantic Coast Conference baseball tournament
Atlantic Coast Conference baseball tournament
Baseball competitions in Durham, North Carolina
College baseball tournaments in North Carolina